Astroparticle Physics is a peer-reviewed scientific journal covering experimental and theoretical research in the interacting fields of cosmic ray physics, astronomy and astrophysics, cosmology, and particle physics. It was established in 1992 and is published monthly by North-Holland, an imprint of Elsevier. According to the Journal Citation Reports, the journal has a 2020 impact factor of 2.724.

References

External links
 

Astrophysics journals
Elsevier academic journals
English-language journals
Monthly journals
Publications established in 1992